Telophorus viridis viridis, also known as the gorgeous bushshrike or Perrin's bushshrike, is a bird in the family Malaconotidae.  It is found in Angola, Republic of the Congo, Democratic Republic of the Congo, Gabon, and Zambia.  Its natural habitats are tropical forests and tropical moist shrubland.  Many authorities consider this to be the nominate subspecies of the four-colored bushshrike.  Others consider both to be distinct species, in which case this species takes on the scientific name Telophorus viridis, having been distinguished first.

References

Telophorus
Birds of Southern Africa
Birds described in 1817
Taxa named by Louis Jean Pierre Vieillot
Taxonomy articles created by Polbot